This is the discography for Motown as well as its subsidiaries and imprints.

Singles

Number-one singles
This is a list of singles released on one of the various labels owned by Motown that reached #1 on the Billboard Hot 100 in the United States.

Albums

1961

1962

1963

1964

1965

1966

1967

1968

1969

1970

1971

1972

1973

1974

1975

1976

1977

1978

1979

1980

1981

1982

1983

1984

1985

1986

1987

1988

1989

1990

1991

1992

1993

1994

1995

1996

1997

1998

1999

2000

2001

2002

2003

2004

2005

2008

Motown subsidiary labels

Major divisions
Tamla Records
Motown Records
Gordy Records
Tamla-Motown Records

Secondary R&B labels
Check-Mate Records
Miracle Records
MoWest Records
Motown Yesteryear
Soul Records
V.I.P. Records
Weed Records

Alternative genre labels

Country
Mel-o-dy Records
Hitsville Records

Hip hop/rap
Wondirection Records
Mad Sounds Recordings
Never Broke Again

Jazz
Workshop Jazz Records
Blaze Records
Mo Jazz Records

Rock
Rare Earth Records
Prodigal Records
Morocco Records

Other
Divinity Records
Black Forum Records
Natural Resources Records
Motown Latino Records
Ocean Front Records

Independent labels distributed by Motown
Biv 10 Records
Chisa Records
CTI Records
Three Brothers Records
Ecology Records
Gull Records
Manticore Records

British (pre-Tamla-Motown) labels
London American Records
Fontana Records
Oriole Records
Stateside Records

Miscellaneous labels associated with Motown
Rayber Records
IPG Records
Rich Records
Summer Camp Records
Inferno Records

References

External links
 a Motown singles discography website

Motown
Motown singles
Motown, List of albums released by
Rhythm and blues discographies
Pop music discographies